The Town of Haswell is a Statutory Town located in Kiowa County, Colorado, United States. The town population was 71 at the 2020 United States Census.

History
Haswell was established in 1905 or 1908, having grown up around one of the section houses built along the Missouri Pacific Railroad in eastern Colorado that were named after prominent men in alphabetical order from the Kansas State line to the west toward Pueblo, by Helen, daughter of railroad magnate Jay Gould, at the time of the railroad line's construction in 1888. It was incorporated in 1920.

Geography
Haswell is located in western Kiowa County at  (38.451774, -103.163116). Colorado State Highway 96 passes through the town, leading east  to Eads, the county seat, and southwest  to Ordway.

Demographics

As of the census of 2000, there were 84 people, 31 households, and 24 families residing in the town. The racial makeup of the town was 90.48% White, 2.38% African American, 5.95% Native American, and 1.19% from two or more races.

There were 31 households, out of which 41.9% had children under the age of 18 living with them, 61.3% were married couples living together, 16.1% had a female householder with no husband present, and 19.4% were non-families. 19.4% of all households were made up of individuals, and 9.7% had someone living alone who was 65 years of age or older. The average household size was 2.71 and the average family size was 3.04.

In the town, the population was spread out, with 33.3% under the age of 18, 8.3% from 18 to 24, 28.6% from 25 to 44, 16.7% from 45 to 64, and 13.1% who were 65 years of age or older. The median age was 34 years. For every 100 females, there were 127.0 males. For every 100 females age 18 and over, there were 124.0 males.

The median income for a household in the town was $30,938, and the median income for a family was $32,500. Males had a median income of $31,875 versus $9,750 for females. The per capita income for the town was $15,638. There were 25.0% of families and 27.3% of the population living below the poverty line, including 34.6% of under eighteens and none of those over 64.

Notable facilities
Haswell is believed to have the United States' smallest jail.

The center includes a  parabolic dish antenna used for radio astronomy research.

Naming of Intel Microchip
In 2013, the Intel corporation announced that it was naming its newest processor microarchitecture Haswell, after the town.

See also

Colorado
Bibliography of Colorado
Index of Colorado-related articles
Outline of Colorado
List of counties in Colorado
List of municipalities in Colorado
List of places in Colorado

References

External links

Town of Haswell website
CDOT map of the Town of Haswell
Illustrated historical description
archive.org

Towns in Kiowa County, Colorado
Towns in Colorado